Americium fluoride may refer to:

 Americium(III) fluoride
 Americium(IV) fluoride